Araniko Secondary English Boarding School is an English medium private boarding school operated by a group in collaboration and is situated at Myanglung Municipality of Terhathum District in eastern development region of Nepal. The current principal of the school is Hem Raj Adhikari.

History 
This school is the second  established boarding school in the city. After deep jyoti English boarding school it is the second English boarding school in myanglung.

Library 
It has a modern fashioned library endowed with all kind of books and magazines related to education.

Footnotes

External links
 Araniko Secondary English Boarding School - Terhathum official page, Facebook.com

Schools in Nepal
Buildings and structures in Tehrathum District